Aadarsa Kutumbam is a 1969 Indian Telugu-language drama film directed by K. Pratyagatma. It stars Akkineni Nageswara Rao and Jayalalithaa, with music composed by S. Rajeswara Rao. It was produced by A. V. Subba Rao under the Prasad Art Productions banner. The film won the National Film Award for Best Feature Film in Telugu for the year 1969.

Plot
The film deals with a joint family, Raghavendra Rao (V. Nagayya) and his wife Rajyalakshmi (Hemalatha) are paterfamilias who has four sons and a daughter. The elder son Pattabhi (Gummadi) and his wife Janaki (Anjali Devi) look after the house finances and agricultural work. The second son Prakasam (Nagabhushanam) is involved in village politics, wastes time & money therein, and his wife Jaya (S. Varalakshmi) is a shrew who doesn't contribute anything to the welfare of the family. The third son Pratap (Bheemaraju) is a bodybuilder who is obsessed with diet & fitness and not bothered about his wife Rama (Geethanjali). The youngest one Prasad (Akkineni Nageswara Rao) studies in the city where he falls in love with a beautiful girl Saroja (Jayalalithaa) a doctor. The only daughter is Chandra (Anitha), and her husband Suryam (Padmanabham), suffers from night blindness. He doesn't do any work and passes time lazily by living in his in-law's house. To make things worse, his mother Durgamma (Suryakantham) always visits the house and creates rifts in the family. Pattabhi & Janaki's goodwill is mistaken as inability and all these people make use of their innocence. Meanwhile, Prasad marries Saroja at this juncture, she enters the family when everybody is in a mess with unnecessary expenditures, arguments, and cheating. So, Prasad & Saroja decide to separate the family and they do so by cheating. The rest of the story is about how they reunite the affections and relations between family members.

Cast

Akkineni Nageswara Rao as Prasad
Jayalalithaa as Saroja 
V. Nagayya as Raghavendra Rao 
Gummadi as Pattabhi
Nagabhushanam as Prakasam
Padmanabham as Suryam
Ramana Reddy as Damodaram 
Sakshi Ranga Rao as Appaiah Panthulu 
Bheemaraju as Pratap 
Anjali Devi as Janaki 
S. Varalakshmi as Jaya
Suryakantham as Durgamma
Hemalatha as Rajyalakshmi 
Geetanjali as Rama
Vijaya Lalitha as Sunita 
Surabhi Balasaraswathi as Rami
Anitha as Chandra

Soundtrack

Music composed by S. Rajeswara Rao.

Awards
 National Film Award for Best Feature Film in Telugu - 1969
 K. Pratyagatma won Nandi Award for Second Best Story Writer (1969)

References

External links
 

1969 films
1960s Telugu-language films
Best Telugu Feature Film National Film Award winners
Films directed by Kotayya Pratyagatma